Ischyrus is a genus of pleasing fungus beetles in the family Erotylidae. There are at least three described species in Ischyrus.

Species
There are several species in the Ischyrus genus:
 Ischyrus aleator Boyle, 1954
 Ischyrus dunedinensis Blatchley, 1917 (three-spotted pleasing fungus beetle)
 Ischyrus parcarum
 Ischyrus quadripunctatus (Olivier, 1791) (four-spotted fungus beetle)
 Ischyrus angularis
 Ischyrus audbalus
 Ischyrus auriculatus
 Ischyrus bahiae
 Ischyrus bellus
 Ischyrus bogotae
 Ischyrus boucardi
 Ischyrus celatus
 Ischyrus chacojae
 Ischyrus circumcinctus
 Ischyrus collatinus
 Ischyrus conductus
 Ischyrus consimilus
 Ischyrus cordiformis
 Ischyrus decorus
 Ischyrus disconiger
 Ischyrus distinguendus
 Ischyrus duponti
 Ischyrus elegantulus
 Ischyrus ephippiatus
 Ischyrus episcaphulinus
Ischyrus erosus
Ischyrus fraternus
Ischyrus frontalis
Ischyrus fulmineus
Ischyrus goliai
Ischyrus grammicus
Ischyrus ichnus
Ischyrus impressopunctatus
Ischyrus impressus
Ischyrus incertus
Ischyrus insolens
Ischyrus interruptus
Ischyrus joplini
Ischyrus kempferi
Ischyrus kovariki
Ischyrus laetus
Ischyrus macularis
Ischyrus malleus
Ischyrus mimus
Ischyrus monochromatus
Ischyrus mystacis
Ischyrus natalensis
Ischyrus nigrolineatus
Ischyrus nitidior
Ischyrus nobilis
Ischyrus palliatus
Ischyrus parallelus
Ischyrus pardalinus
Ischyrus patruelis
Ischyrus peruae
Ischyrus pictus
Ischyrus poseidon
Ischyrus proximus
Ischyrus putei
Ischyrus pyropodus
Ischyrus rubens
Ischyrus sapphirus
Ischyrus scriptus
 Ischyrus scutellaris
 Ischyrus septemsignatus
 Ischyrus sheppardi
 Ischyrus similior
 Ischyrus tetragrammus
Ischyrus tetraspilotus
Ischyrus tetrasticus
Ischyrus tripunctatus
Ischyrus undulatus
Ischyrus variabilis
Ischyrus vespertilio
Ischyrus vittatus

References

Further reading

External links

 

Erotylidae